The Massachusetts Handicap, frequently referred to as the "MassCap", was a flat thoroughbred horse race for three-year-olds and up held annually at Suffolk Downs in East Boston, Massachusetts, United States. It was an ungraded stakes race run over a distance of 9 furlongs on dirt. The race received Grade III status by the American Graded Stakes Committee for 2009, but the race was never held. The MassCap was stripped of its graded status in 2011 as a result of not being run for two consecutive years.

History
The Massachusetts Handicap was won by some of the biggest names in Thoroughbred racing history including Hall of Fame inductees Riva Ridge, Stymie, Seabiscuit, Eight Thirty and Triple Crown winner Whirlaway who broke the track record in his 1942 win. On August 7, 1937, the great Seabiscuit won his seventh consecutive stakes race in track record time for the $70,000 purse of the 1937 MassCap.

The MassCap had been a graded stakes race from 1973 through 1989. Notables horses such as Riva Ridge, Dixieland Band, and Private Terms all won during this time frame. In 1987, Waquoit beat Broad Brush in a thrilling race. In the 1955 Massachusetts Handicap, jockey Sam Boulmetis, Sr. rode Helioscope to a track record time of 2:01 for 1¼ miles.

The Suffolk Downs track continued to fight for its economic life since closing for a three-year period beginning in 1989. The MassCap was a frequent casualty of those circumstances. 

Later, in an attempt to bring the MassCap back to its former glory, new ownership offered a purse of $500,000 in 1995 and quickly drew the likes of Cigar and Skip Away to the track. By 1997, the race was, once again, a graded race. Suffolk Downs also provided a bonus of $200,000 if the winner won multiple Grade I or Group 1 stakes races at a mile or longer.  An additional $100,000 was to be awarded if the winner had won one Grade I or Group 1 race and at least one other graded stakes race at a mile or longer in 2007.

Part of the Breeders' Cup Challenge series, the winner of the 2008 Massachusetts Handicap -- which would prove to be the final MassCap held -- automatically qualified for the Breeders' Cup Classic.

Records
Time record:
 1⅛ miles: 1:47.27 – Skip Away (1998) (new track record)

Largest margin of victory:
 14 lengths –  Commentator (2008)

Most wins:
 2 – First Fiddle (1944, 1945), Air Pilot (1959, 1962), Smart (1964, 1965), Cigar (1995, 1996), Skip Away (1997, 1998)

Most wins by a jockey:
 4 – Jerry D. Bailey (1995, 1996, 1998, 2001)

Most wins by a trainer:
 3 – Sonny Hine (1986, 1997, 1998) and Clyde Troutt (1959, 1960, 1962)

Winners

* Day Court finished first in 1959 but was disqualified and placed second.* Raced in two divisions in 1977.

References

External links
 History at MassCap.com

1935 establishments in Massachusetts
2008 disestablishments in Massachusetts
Open mile category horse races
Recurring sporting events disestablished in 2008
Recurring sporting events established in 1935
Suffolk Downs
Sports competitions in Boston
Ungraded stakes races in the United States